HMS Herald was a Hecla-class ocean survey ship that served with the Royal Navy during both the Falklands War and Gulf War.

Design and construction
Herald was the fourth ship of the class and was built to an improved design to the three earlier Heclas. She was laid down at the Scottish shipbuilder Robb Caledon's Leith shipyard on 9 November 1971, was launched on 4 October 1973 and completed on 31 October 1974. She had the Pennant number A138.

Displacement was  standard and  full load. The ship had a complement of 128 officers and other ranks.

Operational history

During the Falklands War, Herald served as a Red Cross ship, ferrying casualties from San Carlos to Montevideo. During 1983 she served as a South Atlantic Guardship.

Following the Iraqi Invasion of Kuwait in August 1990, Herald was deployed to the Eastern Mediterranean as a support ship for the minehunters of the 3rd Mine Countermeasures Squadron. She continued to support the squadron after it moved to the Gulf, and was still on station when the Gulf War air campaign began in January 1991, but was relieved by sister ship .

In 1998 she located the wreck of HMS Russell, off Malta. The ship's pennant number changed to H 138 in 1998.

In December 2000, Herald answered a Mayday call and took part in a joint operation with the Royal Air Force to rescue the crew of the Cypriot ferry Royal Prince. The 35-metre ship sank in rough seas, but the crew were rescued by a RAF helicopter from RAF Akrotiri and landed on HMS Herald.

Decommissioning

After decommissioning, Herald joined her sister  in Waterford after a brief re-fit in Cork dockyard. She was renamed Somerville after Admiral James Somerville and was used for a hydrographic survey in Irish waters. The ship was sold in 2004 to Indian breakers and beached on 18 June of that year.

Postage stamps
Herald appears on two stamps with Prince Andrew, Duke of York, issued by Saint Helena.

References

 

Hecla-class survey vessels
Ships built in Leith
Falklands War naval ships of the United Kingdom
Gulf War ships of the United Kingdom
Hospital ships of the Royal Navy
Hospital ships during the Falklands War
1974 ships